Kenneth Robert Woodward (born 16 October 1947) is an English former professional footballer who played as a winger in the Football League for Orient.

References

1947 births
Living people
Footballers from Battersea
English footballers
Association football midfielders
Leyton Orient F.C. players
English Football League players